NDTV Prime is an Indian information and entertainment channel owned by NDTV. It was launched on June 5, 2017. Prior to the launch, NDTV transferred their business from profit to regular business and finance segments on NDTV 24x7.

NDTV Prime is available 24 hours a day, offering information and entertainment programs that include topics like gadgets, automobiles, education, careers, property, entertainment, art, and comedy.

Since mid 2020, NDTV Prime has been replaced by NDTV Profit  and some programs formerly broadcast on prime are now broadcast on NDTV Profit after market hours, and at weekends.

References

External links
 Official site

NDTV Group
Television stations in New Delhi
English-language television stations in India
2017 establishments in India